This is a list of fellows of the Royal Society elected in its tenth year, 1669.

Fellows 
Thomas Barrington (b. 1648)
George Castle (1635–1673)
Urban Hiarne (1641–1724)
James Hoare (1642–1679)
Anthony Horneck (1641–1697)
Edward Jeffreys (1655–1702)
Marcello Malpighi (1628–1694)
Gaspar Merez de Souza (1669–1684)
Georg Stiernhielm (1598–1672)
Silas Titus (1623–1704)

References

1669
1669 in science
1669 in England